Baja or Bája may refer to:

Places and jurisdictions

In the Americas
 Baja California Peninsula, in northwestern Mexico
 Baja California state in the northern part of the above peninsula
 Baja California Sur state in the southern part of the above peninsula
 Baja Verapaz, department of Guatemala

In Europe
 Bája, Hungarian name of Baia in Suceava County, Romania, a former capital and bishopric of Moldavia
 Baja, Hungary, city

People
 Nedeljko Bajić Baja, Serbian folk singer
 Baja Mali Knindža, Bosnian Serb folk singer
 Baja Tamindžić, Serbian football goalkeeper

Arts, entertainment, and media
 Baja (film), a 2018 American film
 Baja: Edge of Control, a 2008 video game
 "Baja", a 1963 song by The Astronauts
 "Baja", a 1993 song by Böhse Onkelz from Schwarz
 "Baja", a 1999 song by Sasha from Xpander

Automobiles
 Baja bug, car originated for racing
 Subaru Baja, Subaru crossover automobile

Sports
 Baja SAE, the SAE Mini Baja Competition
 Baja 1000, a Mexican rally raid race
 Italian Baja, Italian rally raid race

Other uses 
 Baja Jacket, a long-sleeved hooded pullover (garment)
 Patella baja, also known as attenuated patella alta, a pathology of the patella
 Baja Fresh, a Tex-Mex restaurant chain
 Baja Blast, a Taco Bell exclusive flavor of Mountain Dew
 Baja (plant), a genus of ferns

See also 
 
 
 Baha (disambiguation)
 Baja California (disambiguation)
 Bajan (disambiguation)